Sensory overload occurs when one or more of the body's senses experiences over-stimulation from the environment.  There are many environmental elements that affect an individual. Examples of these elements are urbanization, crowding, noise, mass media, and technology.

Symptoms
There are a wide variety of symptoms that have been found to be associated with sensory overload. These symptoms can occur in both children and adults. Some of these symptoms are:
 Irritability
 "Shutting down", or refusing to participate in activities and interact with others
 Avoiding touching or being touched
 Complaining about noises that do not affect others
 Getting overexcited
 Covering eyes around bright lights
 Making poor eye contact
 Covering ears to close out sounds or voices
 Constantly changing activities without completing any tasks
 Irritation caused by shoes, socks, tags, or different textures
 Over-sensitivity to touch, movement, sights, or sounds
 Having trouble with social interactions
 Extremely high or extremely low activity levels
 Muscle tension
 Hyperhidrosis (extreme perspiration)
 Fidgeting and restlessness
 Angry outbursts
 Self-harm
 Sleeplessness and fatigue
 Difficulty concentrating

Causes
Sensory overload can result from the overstimulation of any of the senses.
 Hearing: loud noise, or sound from multiple sources, such as several people talking at once.
 Sight: crowded or cluttered spaces, bright lights, strobing lights, or environments with much movement such as crowds or frequent scene changes on television.
 Smell and taste: strong aromas or spicy foods.
 Touch: tactile sensations such as being touched by another person or the feel of cloth on skin.
 Vestibular: such as dizziness or motion sickness.

As component of other disorders and conditions
Sensory overload has been found to be associated with other disorders and conditions such as:
 Attention deficit hyperactivity disorder (ADHD)
 People with ADHD display hypersensitivity to sensory stimuli from a young age; this hypersensitivity often persists into adulthood. People with ADHD do not seem to differ in sensory processing in regard to most event-related potentials; however, they do display significant differences in event related potential responses involved with late cognitive processing such as P300, CNV, Pe which may indicate that hypersensitivity in ADHD is caused by abnormalities in the expectation of and allocation of attention to sensory stimuli. Abnormalities in later cognitive processing may contribute to hypersensitivity and the sensation of sensory overload in people with ADHD.
 Posttraumatic stress disorder (PTSD)
 People with PTSD are prone to sensory overload due to a general hypersensitivity to sensory stimuli partially caused by sensory gating issues; this is supported by the fact that people with PTSD have impaired P50 gating and an inability to filter redundant auditory stimuli. Irregularities in the production of and response to neurotransmitters is one possible etiology for sensory overload in people with PTSD; specifically, people with PTSD may display hypersensitivity to stimuli due to chronic homeostatic imbalances in dopamine and norepinephrine. The hypersensitivity of people with PTSD to sensory stimuli is supported by an augmented P300 event-related potential response compared to healthy controls which indicates a semi-permanent heightened attention to deviant and salient stimuli.
 Obsessive-compulsive disorder (OCD)
 People with OCD display a cognitive inflexibility to changing environments. It seems that people with OCD are hypersensitive to stimuli that are indicative of negative situations, and this hypersensitivity may contribute to sensory overload. It is theorized that people with OCD have compulsions to carry out repetitive actions due to self-doubt and a desire to achieve perfection. A common trigger for compulsions in people with OCD is the perception of contamination; people with OCD commonly deal with the perception of contamination with repetitive hand washing. In a situation where a person with OCD is subjected to an environmental stimuli that elicits compulsion, such as getting dirt on their hands, they may feel overwhelmed by sensory stimuli and deal with this sensory overload through mitigating the stress with compulsions such as repetitive hand washing.
 Dissociative Identity Disorder (DID)
 Schizophrenia (see also sensory gating)
 People with schizophrenia are prone to sensory overload since people with the condition cannot divert their attention from repetitive and unimportant sensory stimuli. The inability to focus on relevant stimuli and filter out unnecessary and excessive sensory stimuli displayed in schizophrenics is due to physiological sensory gating issues, and the paired click P50 test can be used to determine if an individual has abnormalities in sensory gating and is therefore prone to sensory overload. A proposed theory that explains sensory overload in schizophrenic patients is that abnormalities in alpha-7 and low affinity nicotinic acetylcholine receptors prevent normal transduction pathways between the cortex and hippocampus that facilitate sensory gating.
 Misophonia, a pathological 'hatred of sound'
 People with misophonia display hypersensitivity to certain pattern-based noises such as the sound of chewing, slurping, finger tapping, foot shuffling, throat clearing, pen clicking, and keyboard tapping; people with misophonia respond to triggering sounds with emotional distress and increased hormonal activity of the sympathetic system. When people with misophonia are subjected to noises that trigger misophonic responses, they feel as if they are being overloaded by auditory stimuli and seek to escape from or block out the triggering noise. Compared to healthy controls, people with misophonia display a lower N100 peak in response to mismatch negative (MMN), but this is not a reliable biomarker for the condition and sensory overload. A more reliable indicator that hints at proneness to sensory overload is heightened activation of the anterior insular cortex which is evoked by trigger noises and can be measured by fMRI; the anterior insular cortex may be involved with the pathway that gives rise to the sensation of sensory overload in people with misophonia.
 Synesthesia
 There is evidence that the visual cortex of people with grapheme-color synesthesia is more excitable than that of typical people; additionally, people with grapheme-color synesthesia respond more strongly to visual stimuli compared to people without the condition. People with grapheme-color synesthesia report feeling visual stress and discomfort in response to gratings of mid and high spatial frequencies, correlating to a sensory overload response evoked by intense visual stimuli.
 Generalized anxiety disorder (GAD)
 People with general anxiety disorder are highly sensitive to external anxiety triggering stimuli and deal with exposure to these triggers through neurotic thoughts. People with GAD are biased to perceive sensory stimuli as negative or threatening and this bias feeds into negative thought processes which further exacerbate feelings of worry, stress, and anxiety. People with GAD are hypersensitive and hypervigilant to ambiguous, neutral, and emotional stimuli and often compartmentalize such stimuli as negative. People with GAD are prone to sensory overload when in novel settings or interacting with new people since ambiguous and neutral stimuli in these instances are usually processed as threatening or negative; adolescents and children with GAD are especially avoidant of and distressed by novel stimuli which is theorized to be elicited by either a hyperactive sympathetic nervous system or an under-active parasympathetic nervous system.
 Autistic spectrum disorders
 People with autistic spectrum disorders including autism and Asperger syndrome experience auditory hypersensitivity which can lead to sensory overload. Although people with autism do not have abnormalities in P50 sensory gating, they have anomalies in sensory gating related to the N100 test which indicates an irregularity in attention-related direction and top-down mental pathways. It is speculated that disturbances and issues with directing attention towards relevant or salient stimuli, evinced by deviations from standard P200 and N100 responses, is partially responsible for the sensation of being overwhelmed by sensory stimuli in autistic people.
 Tourette syndrome (TS)
 It has been suggested that people with Tourette syndrome have a hypersensitivity to bodily sensation that originates in higher order processing partially the result of distorted and higher than average amplitude of afferent somatic signals. People with Tourette syndrome sense urges to do tics that are often localized to regions of the body that carry out the tic response. It is theorized that tics might be caused by sensory processing issues where sensations trigger movements which manifest as tics. Additionally, people with Tourette syndrome display a moderate inability to inhibit distracting stimuli which might lead to sensory overload. People with Tourette syndrome may be prone to carry out tics in an environment of overwhelming sensory stimuli.
 Fibromyalgia (FM)
 People with fibromyalgia are hypersensitive to intense stimuli such as bright lights, loud noises, perfumes, and cold temperatures; people with the condition also have hyper-excitable nociceptors. When people with fibromyalgia are subjected to intense stimuli, they experience sensory overload in the form of pain. It is theorized that abnormal activity of the left dorsolateral prefrontal cortex and reduced production of or reception to serotonin are partially responsible for the sensation of pain in response to intense stimuli.
 Chronic fatigue syndrome (ME/CFS)
 People with chronic fatigue syndrome display a hypersensitivity to noxious stimuli, stress, and pain. These sensitivities are partially explained by abnormal neurotransmitter pathways involving serotonin and acetylcholine. When people with the condition are exposed to intense stimuli, they report pain, fatigue, nausea, and reduced cognitive abilities; chronic sensory overload causes the sensation of brain fog.

Treatments
There are many different ways to treat sensory overload. One is to reduce this tension is to participate in occupational therapy; however, there are many ways for people with symptoms to reduce it themselves. Being able to identify one's own triggers of sensory overload can help reduce, eliminate, or avoid them. Most often the quickest way to ease sensory overload symptoms is to remove oneself from the situation. Deep pressure against the skin combined with proprioceptive input that stimulates the receptors in the joints and ligaments often calms the nervous system. Reducing sensory input such as eliminating distressing sounds and lowering the lights can help. Calming, focusing on music works for some. If a quick break does not relieve the problem, an extended rest is advised. People with sensory processing issues may benefit from a sensory diet of activities and accommodations designed to prevent sensory overload and retrain the brain to process sensory input more typically. It is important in situations of sensory overload to calm oneself and return to a normal level.

Prevention

There are three different methods to address sensory overload:  avoidance, setting limits, and meditation. The process of avoidance involves creating a more quiet and orderly environment. This includes keeping the noise to a minimum and reducing the sense of clutter. To prevent sensory overload, it is important to rest before big events and focus one's attention and energy on one thing at a time. Setting limits involves restricting the amount of time spent on various activities and selecting settings to carefully avoid crowds and noise. One may also limit interactions with specific people to help prevent sensory overload.

Marketing 
It can be difficult to distinguish and understand information when experiencing sensory overload. Even such meaningless stimuli such as white noise or flickering lights may induce sensory overload. Sensory overload is common among consumers as many corporations compete with each other especially when advertising.  Advertisers will use the best colours, words, sounds, textures, designs and much more to get the attention of a customer. This can influence the consumer, as they will be drawn to a product that is more attention grabbing. However, policy makers and advertisers must be aware that too much information or attention-grabbing products can cause sensory overload.

Implications of public policy 

Implications of public policy in regards to information overload have two main assumptions. The assumptions the policymakers have are, first, to assume that consumers have a great deal of processing capacity and a great deal of time to process information. Secondly, consumers can always absorb the information without serious concern about how much information has been presented. As researchers have pointed out, policymakers should better understand the difference between the process and availability of information. This will help decrease the possibility of information overload. In some cases, the time to process such information in a commercial can be 6 out of 30 seconds. This can lead consumers confused and overloaded with such fast-paced information thrown at them. To understand how consumers process information three factors must be analyzed. Factors such as the amount of information given, the source of corrective information and the way in which it is all presented to the consumer. Different types of media have different processing demands. An optimal outcome for policy makers to influence advertisers to try is to present information through a TV commercial stating simple facts about a product and then encourage the audience to check out their website for more details. Therefore, their quick processing time of a commercial was not overloaded with information thus saving the consumer from sensory overload.

Implications for the consumers 

Consumers today are forced to learn to cope with overloading and an abundance of information, through the radio, billboards, television, newspapers and much more. Information is everywhere and being thrown at consumers from every angle and direction. Therefore, Naresh K. Malhotra, author of the paper "Information and Sensory Overload", presents the following guidelines. First, consumers must try to limit the intake of external information and sensory inputs to avoid sensory overload. This can be done by tuning out irrelevant information presented by the media and marketers to get the attention of the consumer. Second, record important information externally rather than mentally. Information can be easily forgotten mentally once the individual becomes overloaded by their sense. Thus it is recommended for a consumer to write down important information rather than store it mentally. Third, when examining a product, do not overload their senses by examining more than five products at a time. This will lead to confusion and frustration. Fourth, process information where there is less irrelevant information around. This will eliminate external information and sensory distractions such as white noise and other information presented in an environment. Finally, it is important to make consuming a pleasant and relaxed experience. This will help diminish the stress, overwhelming feeling, and experience of sensory overload.

Case histories
Not many studies have been done on sensory overload, but one example of a sensory overload study was reported by Lipowski (1975) as part of his research review on the topic that discussed the work done by Japanese researchers at Tohoku University. The Tohoku researchers exposed their subjects to intense visual and auditory stimuli presented randomly in a condition of confinement ranging in duration from three to five hours. Subjects showed heightened and sustained arousal as well as mood changes such as aggression, anxiety, and sadness. These results have helped open the door to further research on sensory overload.

History
Sociologist Georg Simmel contributed to the description of sensory overload in his 1903 essay "The Metropolis and Mental Life". Simmel describes an urban landscape of constant sensory stimuli against which the city-dweller must create a barrier in order to remain sane. For Simmel, the sensory overload of modern urban life depletes the body's reservoirs of energy, leading, among other things, to a jaded or blasé [blasiert] mentality and a calculating, instrumentalizing approach to others. Simmel's approach can be compared to Freud's writings on shell shock as well as Walter Benjamin's analysis of "shock" and urban life in his 1939 essay "On Some Motifs in Baudelaire".

See also 
 Sensory adaptation
 Sensory deprivation
 Sensory processing disorders
 Sensory substitution
 Catatonia
 Highly sensitive person
 Heat intolerance

References 

Sensory systems
Perception
Experimental psychology
Psychological torture techniques
Physical torture techniques
Interrogation techniques
Cyberpunk themes